PNS Nasr (A47) is a Type 905 replenishment oiler of the Pakistan Navy. The oiler was constructed in the People's Republic of China by the Dalian Shipbuilding Industry Company and entered service in 1987.

History
Nasr was ordered by Pakistan in late-1986 and completed to Pakistani requirements. She entered service in 1987.

A Phalanx CIWS was installed in 1995; it may have come from the retired County-class destroyer PNS Babur.

On 21 October 1998, the oiler suffered minor from being rammed by the commercial tanker Sun Marsat at Karachi.

In April 2003, Nasr and  deployed to the Port of Chittagong in Bangladesh to support the Bangladeshi Navy. In 2006, she was visited Langkawi in Malaysia before reporting back her homeport.

She provided relief to the Maldives after the 2004 Indian Ocean earthquake and tsunami, and was the first foreign contingent to start rescue operations there.

Nasr participated in the 2014 Kakadu military exercise in Australia. A crewman deserted on September 7 at around 04:30 while the ship was docked at Darwin; he was found on September 8.

In 2018, Nasr and Khaibar, under the command of Commodore Javaid Iqbal, paid a goodwill visit to Tanzania, Mauritius, and Kenya to support their navies activities.

In 2021, Nasr conducted a disaster relief mission in Africa, sailing to Port Sudan, Djibouti, and Cotonou, and delivering 1,000 tonnes of rice as humanitarian aid from Pakistan to Djibouti, Sudan, Benin and Niger. It also conducted a goodwill visit to Mombasa, Kenya.

See also
 Africa–Pakistan relations
 China–Pakistan relations
 China–Pakistan military relations

References

Sources

1986 ships
Fuqing-class replenishment ships
China–Pakistan military relations
Ships of the Pakistan Navy
Tankers of the Pakistan Navy